The General Electric/Allison J35 was the United States Air Force's first axial-flow (straight-through airflow) compressor jet engine. Originally developed by General Electric (GE company designation TG-180) in parallel with the Whittle-based centrifugal-flow J33, the J35 was a fairly simple turbojet, consisting of an eleven-stage axial-flow compressor and a single-stage turbine.

Like the J33, the design of the J35 originated at General Electric, but major production was by the Allison Engine Company.

Design and development
While developing the T31 axial turboprop in 1943 General Electric realized that they had the resources to design an axial flow turbojet at the same time as their centrifugal-flow J33 engine. They recognized the axial would have more potential for the future and went ahead with the TG-180 engine. GE axial compressor designs were developed from the NACA 8-stage compressor.

The engine had its starter and accessories (fuel control, fuel pump, oil pumps, hydraulic pump, RPM generator) mounted in the center of the compressor inlet. This accessory layout, as used on centrifugal engines, restricted the area available for compressor inlet air. It was carried over to the J47 but revised (relocated to an external gearbox) on the J73 when a  increase in airflow was required. It also had an inlet debris guard which was common on early jet engines.

GE developed a variable afterburner for the engine, although electronic control linked with engine controls had to wait until the J47. Marrett describes one of the potential consequences of manual control of the engine and afterburner on an turbine engine: if the afterburner lit but the pilot failed to ensure the nozzle opened, the RPM governor could overfuel the engine until the turbine failed.

Operational history
The General Electric J35 first flew in the Republic XP-84 Thunderjet in 1946. Late in 1947, complete responsibility for the development and production of the engine was transferred to the Allison Division of the General Motors Corporation and some J35s were also built by GM's Chevrolet division. More than 14,000 J35s had been built by the time production ended in 1955.

The J35 was used to power the Bell X-5 variable-sweep research aircraft and various prototypes such as the Douglas XB-43 Jetmaster, North American XB-45 Tornado, Convair XB-46, Boeing XB-47 Stratojet, Martin XB-48, and Northrop YB-49. It is probably best known, however, as the engine used in two of the leading fighters of the United States Air Force (USAF) in the 1950s: the Republic F-84 Thunderjet and the Northrop F-89 Scorpion.

A largely redesigned development, the J35-A-23, was later produced as the Allison J71, developing  thrust.

Variants
Data from:Aircraft engines of the World 1953, Aircraft engines of the World 1950

J35-GE-2  thrust, prototypes built by General Electric.
J35-GE-7  thrust, built by General Electric, powered the 2 Republic XP-84 Thunderjet prototypes
J35-GE-15  thrust, built by General Electric, powered the sole Republic XP-84A Thunderjet
J35-A-3  thrust
J35-C-3  thrust, production by Chevrolet.
J35-C-3  thrust, production by Chevrolet.
J35-A-4 Similar to -29,  thrust
J35-A-5  thrust
J35-A-9  thrust
J35-A-11 Similar to -29,  thrust
J35-A-13  thrust
J35-A-13C
J35-A-15 Similar to -29,  thrust, powered the 15 Republic YP-84 Thunderjets
J35-A-15C  thrust
J35-A-17 Similar to -29,  thrust
J35-A-17A Similar to -29,  thrust
J35-A-17D  thrust
J35-A-19 Similar to -17,  thrust
J35-A-21 Similar to -35,  thrust,  with afterburner
J35-A-21A Similar to -35,  thrust,  with afterburner
J35-A-23 Similar to -29,  thrust, original designation for the Allison J71
J35-A-25 Similar to -29,  thrust
J35-A-29  thrust
J35-A-33 Similar to -35,  thrust,   with afterburner, without anti-icing
J35-A-33A Similar to -35,  thrust,   with afterburner, without anti-icing
J35-A-35  thrust,  with afterburner
J35-A-41 Similar to -35,  thrust,  with afterburner, with anti-icing
Model 450company designation for J35 series engines.
General Electric 7E-TG-180-XR-17A  ca  gas power, gas generator for the Hughes XH-17.

Applications
 Bell X-5
 Boeing XB-47 Stratojet
 Convair XB-46
 Douglas D-558-1 Skystreak
 Douglas XB-43 Jetmaster
 Fiat G.80 (proposal only)
 Hughes XH-17 (experimental helicopter) 
 Martin XB-48
 North American FJ-1 Fury
 North American XB-45 Tornado
 North American XP-86 Sabre
 Northrop F-89 Scorpion
 Northrop YB-49
 Republic F-84 Thunderjet
 Vought F7U-3 Cutlass (interim test usage)

Engines on display

 Allison J35 is on public display at Texas Air Museum - Stinson Chapter, San Antonio, Texas
 Allison J35 is on public display at San Jose State University, San Jose, California

Specifications (J35-A-35)

See also

References

Further reading

 
 

J35
1940s turbojet engines